JonArno Lawson is a Canadian writer who has published many books for children and adults, was born in Hamilton, Ontario and raised in nearby Dundas. He now lives in Toronto, Ontario, with his wife and three children.

Career and education
Lawson has a BA in English Literature from McGill University. He also studied briefly at St. John's College (Annapolis/Santa Fe), and at McMaster University in Hamilton, Ontario. He has taught children's poetry in the Master of Arts in Children’s Literature Program at Simmons College, Boston, and at iSchool at UBC.

He has been recognized for his nonsense poetry.

Recognition and awards
Lawson has won The Lion And The Unicorn Award for Excellence in North American Poetry four times, in 2007, 2009, 2013, and 2014. The books were "Enjoy It While It Hurts," "A Voweller's Bestiary," "Black Stars In A White Night Sky," and "Down In The Bottom Of The Bottom Of The Box." His book "The Man In The Moon-Fixer's Mask" was a finalist for this award in 2005.

Lawson’s wordless picture book "Sidewalk Flowers" Sydney Smith (Illustrator),  won the Governor General’s Award For Illustrated Children’s Books in 2015, and was on the New York Times Best Illustrated Books List the same year.

Published works 
Source:
 Love Is An Observant Traveler (Exile Editions, 1997) (illus. Lui Liu)
 Inklings (Exile Editions, 1999)
 The Man In The Moon Fixer's Mask (Pedlar Press, 2004) (illus. Sherwin Tjia)
 Black Stars In A White Night Sky (Pedlar Press, 2006) (illus. Sherwin Tjia)
 A Voweller's Bestiary (Porcupine's Quill, 2008)
 This (And That Was That) (Greenboathouse Press, 2009)
 Think Again (Kids Can Press, 2010) (illus. Julie Morstad)
 There Devil, Eat That (Pedlar Press, 2011)
 Down In The Bottom Of The Bottom Of The Box (Porcupine's Quill, 2012) (illus. Alec Dempster)
 Old MacDonald Had Her Farm (Annick Press, 2012) (illus. Tina Holdcroft)
 Enjoy It While It Hurts (Wolsak and Wynn, 2013) 
 Aloud In My Head (Walker Books Ltd., 2015) (illus. Jonny Hannah)
 Sidewalk Flowers (Groundwood Books, 2015) Sydney Smith (Illustrator)
 The Hobo's Crowbar (Porcupine's Quill, 2016) (Illus. Alec Dempster)
 I regret everything (Espresso Books, 2017)
 Uncle Holland (Groundwood Books, 2017) (illus. Natalie Nelson)
 Leap! (Kids Can Press, 2017) (illus. Josée Bisaillon)
 But It's So Silly: A Cross-cultural Collage of Nonsense, Play, and Poetry (Wolsak and Wynn, 2017)
 Over the Rooftops, Under the Moon (Enchanted Lion Books, 2019) (illus. Nahid Kazemi)
 The Playgrounds of Babel (Groundwood Books, 2019) (illus. Piet Grobler)
 Over the Shop (Candlewick Press, 2021) (illus. Qin Leng)

As Illustrator 

A Vole on a Roll, by Nelson Ball (Shapes and Sounds Press, 2016)

As Contributor 

The Chechens: A Handbook (Routledge, 2005) by Amjad Jaimoukha

References

Living people
1968 births
Canadian children's writers
American children's writers
Canadian male poets
Writers from Hamilton, Ontario
20th-century Canadian male writers
20th-century Canadian poets
21st-century Canadian male writers
21st-century Canadian poets